His Greatest Gamble is a 1934 American drama film directed by John Robertson from a screenplay by Sidney Buchman and Harry Hervey, based on a story by Salisbury Field. The film stars Richard Dix, Dorothy Wilson, Bruce Cabot, and Erin O'Brien-Moore. Edith Fellows also has a role, playing the character of Alice Stebbins as a child.	

A print is held by the Library of Congress.

Plot summary

Cast
 Richard Dix as Phillip
 Dorothy Wilson as Alice
 Bruce Cabot as Stephen
 Erin O'Brien-Moore as Florence
 Leonard Carey as Alfred
 Shirley Grey as Bernice
 Edith Fellows as Alice, as a Child
 Eily Malyon as Jenny

References

External links
 
 
 
 

Films with screenplays by Sidney Buchman
1934 romantic drama films
American black-and-white films
American romantic drama films
1934 films
1930s American films